The Minister for the Economy and Foreign Trade is a position in the Luxembourgian cabinet, either by itself or combined with other positions, since 15 July 1964.

From 15 July 1964 until 6 February 1969, it was known as the Minister for the National Economy and Energy.  In 1969, the Energy brief was separated and recombined with that of the Minister for Transport, leaving the Economy brief to amalgamate with others to create the post of Minister for the National Economy, Middle Class, and Tourism.  Tourism was separated from 16 September 1977, creating the Minister for the National Economy and the Middle Class.  The position of Minister for the Economy was created on 14 July 1989, as it remained since, despite the role's absorption of other responsibilities.  In 2009, it was renamed to the current 'Minister for the Economy and Foreign Trade'.

List of Ministers for the Economy

References
 

 
Economy and Foreign Trade, Minister for